Kongsdal, previously, Tygestrup, is a manor house and estate located approximately  southwest of Holbaek, between Undløse and Mørkøv, Holbæk Municipality, some 60 km west of Copenhagen, Denmark. The three-winged main building from the 1590s is listed.

History

Hvide family
Bishop Absalon, a prominent member of the influential Hvide family, in 1180  presented his land in Undløse Parish to Sorø Abbey. The abbey constructed a home farm (ladegård) at the site which was known as Undløse. It was later expanded with more tenant farms until it comprised most of the parish and much of the surrounding villages.

In  1205, Sorø Abbey ceded Undløse to the family Hvide family in exchange for Pedersborg and the estate was later renamed Tygestrup. The family would, with one short interruption, keep the estate for the next 150 years. In the late 13th century, it was owned by the infamous Marsk Stig Andersen, who was convicted for the murder of Erik Klipping in 1286. All his holdings were confiscated but a settlement in 1309 returned Tygestrup to his son Anders Stigsøn. This son, Stig Andersen, was later part of am unsuccessful rebellion against Valdemar IB and was in 1361 forced to cede Tygestrup  to Antvorskov Abbey to be forgiven for his sins.

After the Reformation, in 1536, Tygestrup was confiscated by the Crown and initially operated as a royal fief.

Reedtz family
 
In 1587, Frederick II granted Tygestrup to Peder Reedtz. He had come to Denmark at the outbreak of the Northern Seven Years' War where he had won the favour of the king. He had for a while served as avener and later been granted a number of fiefs on Zealand9. Peder Reedtz increased the size of the estate through a number of barters with the king. On his death in 1667, it passed to his son Frederik Reedtz. He was, artly as a result of his two marriages, also able to expand the estate. He was also lensmann9 of Vordingborg Castle and a member of the Privy Council. His son, Peder Reedtz, who inherited the estate in 1659, spent most of his time at the royal court in Copenhagen and was in 1667 appointed as Chancellor to Frederick III. Tygestrup was by then a very large estate with 104 tønder hartkorn of land directly under the manor and an additional 800 tønder hartkorn of land managed by its tenant farms.

1669- 1835: Changing owners
 
In 1669, Redtz ceded the estate to Frederick III in exchange for Børgyum Abbey. Frederick III renamed the estate Kongsdal. After Frederick III's death, Kongsdal passed to his son George, Prince of Denmark, who shortly thereafter ceded it to Christopher Parsberg in exchange for Jungshoved. On Parsber'g death in 1672, Kongsdal passed to his brother-in-law Otte Pogwisch. Pogwisch ended up deep in debt and had to sell some of the land. The rest of the estate was after his death sold in public auction to Valdemar Gabel. Up through the 18th century, Kongsdal changed hands many times. In 1718, it was acquired by general  Gregers Juel. In 1731, he sold the estate to colonel Johan von Schack. He added more land through the acquisition of a number of new tenant farms but developed a reputation for mistreating the peasants on his estate.

Lorents Lassen, who owned Kongsdal from 1774, improved the management of the estate. His son, Niels Lassen, continued his father's work but was by the difficult times forced to sell the estate in 1812.  The new owner was Peder Bech.

1835–present: Estrupfamily
 
In 1835, Kongsdal was acquired by Hector Frederik Janson Estrup, the director of Sorø Academy, who had just married Anna Christine Scavenius. He resigned in 1837 to concentrate on managing his estate. Hector Estrup, who held a doctoral degree in history, established a number of libraries and schools on the estate and also wrote a book about its history. His son, Jacob Brønnum Scavenius Estrup, inherited Kongsdal in 1846 but lived at Skaføgaard in Jutland while his mother stayed at Kongsdal. He was one of the leading politicians of his time and served as Prime Minister in 1874–1894. Estrup passed away at Kongsdal in 1913 but had by then already ceded the estate to his son.

Estate
Kongsdal farm house is located in the Holbæk Municipality of Region Zealand. The farm is forested and the forest type in the estate is of Cold-deciduous Forest. The Vegetation Zone belongs to the Cool Temperate Moist Forest of the Holdridge Bioclimatic Zone.

Soil type of Cambisols (CM) in the estate area is of moderate soils. At shallow depths, the soil indicates color or structure changes different from the parent soils.

Owners
 (before 1180) Absalon
 (1180-1280) Sorø Abbey
 (1280-1309) Stig Andersen Hvide
 (1309-1315) Anders Stigsen Hvide
 (1315-1361) Stig Andersen Hvide
 (1361-1536) Antvorskov Kloster
 (1536-1587) Kronen
 (1587-1607) Peder Reedtz
 (1607-1609) Enke Fru Reedtz
 (1609-1655) Frederik Pedersen Reedtz
 (1655-1669) Peder Frederiksen Reedtz
 (1669-1670) Frederik III
 (1670-1671) Christian V of Denmark
 (1671-1672) Christopher Parsberg
 (1672-1681) Otto Pogwisch
 (1681-1698) Valdemar Christopher Gabel
 (1698-1703) Caspar von Bartholin
 (1703-1714) Lars Andersen
 (1714-1725) Gregers Juel
 (1725-1731) Jacob Hjort
 (1731-1748) Johan von Schack
 (1748-1750) Adolph Heinrich von Staffeldt
 (1750-1751) Anne Cathrine von der Maase née (1) von Staffeldt (2) von Hauch
 (1751-1756) Andreas von Hauch
 (1756-1769) Christian Albrecht von Massow von der Osten
 (1769-1794) Lorenz Lassen
 (1794-1812) Niels Lassen
 (1812-1814) Edvard Gram / Peder Bech
 (1814-1815) Edvard Gram
 (1815-1835) Jacob Benzon Resch
 (1835-1846) Hector Frederik Janson Estrup
 (1846-1907) Jacob Brønnum Scavenius Estrup
 (1907-1914) Hector Estrup
 (1914-1941) Mathilde Juel née Estrup
 (1941-1963) Iakob Estrup
 (1963-1990) Iakob Estrup
 (1990-) Hans Iakob Estrup

References

External links

 Official website
 Source

Manor houses in Holbæk Municipality
Listed buildings and structures in Holbæk Municipality
Listed castles and manor houses in Denmark
Farms in Denmark
Buildings and structures associated with the Reedtz family
Buildings and structures associated with the Estrup family
Prince George of Denmark